Anna Biolik is a Canadian diplomat. She is the Regional Director of the Department of Foreign Affairs and International Trade's Vancouver Regional Office. Prior to this, she was Canada's first Ambassador to Mongolia.  She was Canada's Consul General to Saint Petersbourg, Russian Federation from 2001 to 2004, and then Ambassador Extraordinary and Plenipotentiary to Kazakhstan from 2004 to 2006, with concurrent accreditation to the Republic of Kyrgyzstan and the Republic of Tajikistan.

Biolik's parents immigrated to Canada from Poland after World War 2.

References

External links 
 Foreign Affairs and International Trade Canada Complete List of Posts

Year of birth missing (living people)
Living people
Ambassadors of Canada to Russia
Ambassadors of Canada to Kazakhstan
Ambassadors of Canada to Kyrgyzstan
Ambassadors of Canada to Tajikistan
Ambassadors of Canada to Mongolia
Canadian women ambassadors